Ateleia (animal) is a genus of flies belonging to the family Mycetophilidae.

The species of this genus are found in Australia.

Species:
 Ateleia spadicithorax Skuse, 1888

References

Mycetophilidae